, née , is a retired Japanese female mixed martial artist and judoka. She is nicknamed  in reference to her calm appearance when fighting.

Background

Martial arts training

Kondo practiced judo in high school where she was a decorated judoka.

Mixed martial arts career

On , Kondo had a rematch against Mika Harigai, whom kondo defeated once again with an armbar submission in the first round at Smackgirl: Alive!.

On  at Smackgirl: Third Season I, Kondo defeated Guatemalan Mayra Conde by armbar submission in the first round.

It was the first time that she fought with her married name and as a member of Purebred Kyoto.

On  Kondo announced her intentions to retire to dedicate herself to her personal life and possibly give birth.

Kondo had one more grappling match against Marloes Coenen in the +60 kg category of the 2005 ADCC Submission Wrestling World Championship held in California, United States, where Coenen submitted Kondo with a kneebar in the quarterfinals.

On  in her blog, Kondo announced her intentions to return to MMA.

Personal life
In 2004, Kondo (then Kubota) married Purebreed Kyoto owner and Brazilian Jiu-Jitsu instructor Tetsuya Kondo. They have one daughter who was born in 2006. Together they operated the Red Shark Jiu Jitsu Academy in Numazu.

Mixed martial arts record

|-
|Loss
|align=center|11-5-1
| Marloes Coenen
|KO (punch)
|Smackgirl 2005: Cool Fighter Last Stand
|
|align=center|2
|align=center|0:50
|Numazu, Japan
| 
|-
|Loss
|align=center|11-4-1
| Amanda Buckner
|Submission (kneebar)
|Smackgirl 2004: Yuuki Kondo Retirement Celebration
|
|align=center|2
|align=center|0:41
|Tokyo, Japan
| 
|-
|Win
|align=center|11-3-1
| Sarah Boyd
|Submission (keylock)
|Smackgirl 2004: Go West
|
|align=center|3
|align=center|3:35
|Osaka, Japan
| 
|-
|Win
|align=center|10-3-1
| Fatiha Abalhaja
|Submission (armbar)
|Smackgirl: Third Season III
|
|align=center|3
|align=center|3:28
|Tokyo, Japan
| 
|-
|Win
|align=center|9-3-1
| Mayra Conde
|Submission (armbar)
|Smackgirl: Third Season I
|
|align=center|1
|align=center|2:20
|Tokyo, Japan
| 
|-
|Win
|align=center|8-3-1
| Keiko Tamai
|Decision (3-0)
|Smackgirl: Japan Cup 2002 Grand Final
|
|align=center|3
|align=center|5:00
|Tokyo, Japan
| 
|-
|Loss
|align=center|7-3-1
| Angela Reestad
|Submission (armbar)
|Ax Vol. 4
|
|align=center|1
|align=center|2:18
|Tokyo, Japan
| 
|-
|Win
|align=center|7-2-1
| Yuki Morimatsu
|Submission (armbar)
|Ax Vol. 3
|
|align=center|1
|align=center|1:23
|Tokyo, Japan
| 
|-
| Draw
|align=center|6-2-1
| Yoko Takahashi
|Draw
|Zero-One: True Century Creation '02
|
|align=center|3
|align=center|3:00
|Tokyo, Japan
| 
|-
|Win
|align=center|6-2-0
| Hiromi Kanai
|Submission (armbar)
|Smackgirl: Pioneering Spirit
|
|align=center|1
|align=center|0:34
|Tokyo, Japan
| 
|-
|Loss
|align=center|5-2-0
| Ikuma Hoshino
|Decision (0-3)
|Ax Vol. 1: we do the justice
|
|align=center|3
|align=center|5:00
|Tokyo, Japan
| 
|-
|Win
|align=center|5-1-0
| Mika Harigai
|Submission (armbar)
|Smackgirl: Alive!
|
|align=center|1
|align=center|1:34
|Tokyo, Japan
|
|-
|Win
|align=center|4-1-0
| Megumi Sato
|Submission (armbar)
|Smackgirl: Burning Night
|
|align=center|1
|align=center|0:44
|Tokyo, Japan
|
|-
|Win
|align=center|3-1-0
| Aya Koyama
|Decision (3-0)
|Smackgirl: Fighting Chance
|
|align=center|3
|align=center|5:00
|Tokyo, Japan
|
|-
|Win
|align=center|2-1-0
| Mika Harigai
|Submission (armbar)
|Smackgirl: Starting Over
|
|align=center|1
|align=center|0:49
|Tokyo, Japan
|
|-
|Win
|align=center|1-1-0
| Yuta Dum
|TKO (ankle injury)
|ReMix Golden Gate 2001
|
|align=center|1
|align=center|5:00
|Tokyo, Japan
|
|-
|Loss
|align=center|0-1-0
| Marloes Coenen
|Submission (armbar)
|LLPW: L-1 2000 The Strongest Lady
|
|align=center|1
|align=center|2:37
|Tokyo, Japan
|

See also
List of female mixed martial artists

References

External links
 Yuuki Kondo Awakening Profile

Profile at Fightergirls.com

Official blog 
Official website (old) 

1974 births
Living people
Japanese female mixed martial artists
Mixed martial artists utilizing judo
Japanese female judoka
People from Numazu, Shizuoka
Sportspeople from Shizuoka Prefecture